Fakhri 'Abd al-Nur (15 June 1881 – 9 December 1942) was a Coptic Egyptian politician.

References

External links

20th-century Egyptian politicians
1881 births
1942 deaths
Coptic politicians
Egyptian people of Coptic descent